Once Upon a Time was a hit in 1961 for Rochell & the Candles.

It made it to number 20 in the R&B charts and number 26 in the pop charts. It spent a total of three weeks in the pop charts.

It appears on the 16 All Time Great Rare Original Oldies various artists compilation issued on Del-Fi Records.

References

1960 songs